Circlotoma bellatula is a species of sea snail, a marine gastropod mollusk in the family Tornidae.

References

External links
 To World Register of Marine Species

Tornidae
Gastropods described in 1996